Marathon events have been held at the Summer Paralympic Games, for both men and women, since the 1984 Summer Paralympics in Stoke Mandeville and New York City. They are held as part of the Paralympic athletics programme.

Since the 1996 Games in Atlanta, marathon events, along with all other track events, have been categorised as follows:
 Visually impaired athletes compete in categories T11, T12 and T13, based on their level of disability. Totally blind athletes compete in T11 events, and are permitted to run with a sighted guide. (In 1996 only, the categories were named T10, T11 and T12, and blind athletes were thus categorised "T10".) The marathon for visually impaired athletes is held only for men, and in 2008, no marathon was held in categories T11 or T13, leaving the men's T12 marathon as the sole event for visually impaired athletes. The same was true in 2012.
 Athletes with lower limb amputations, competing with prosthetics, run in categories T42 to T44, depending on their level of disability. In the marathon, athletes in these categories were able to compete only in 1996, when they were grouped together in a single event. The event was held for men only.
 Athletes with upper limb amputations compete in category T46. The marathon in this category exists only for men. In 1996, they ran mixed with lower limb amputees. In 2000, they were awarded their distinct race, which was cancelled in 2004 and restored in 2008.
 Wheelchair athletes compete in categories T51 to T54. These are the only categories open to women as well as men for the marathon. In 2008, three marathons were held in these categories: T52 for men, T54 for men and T54 for women. In 2012, there were only two: the men's T54 and the women's T54.

Heinrich Koeberle of Germany, active from 1984 to 2000, is the most successful Paralympic marathon competitor to date, having won four gold medals and one silver. Among the women, Connie Hansen of Denmark and Jean Driscoll of the United States have each won two Paralympic marathons.

Results by Games"Medallists by Event: Athletics: Women's Marathon", International Paralympic Committee

1984
At the 1984 Games in Stoke Mandeville and New York, seven marathons were held for men, and four for women, all for wheelchair athletes. In the men's event 1A, only three runners started the race: Heinrich Koeberle from West Germany, his compatriot H. Lobbering (full name not recorded), and Rainer Kueschall of Switzerland. Only Koeberle reached the finish line. In women's event 5, there were only two competitors, both from Mexico. Both reached the finish line.

Men's events

Women's events

1988
The number of events at the 1988 Summer Paralympics in Seoul was expanded to eleven for men, but restricted to three for women (with category 5 being closed).

Men's events

Women's events

1992
At the 1992 Games in Barcelona, the number of events for men was cut to six: three for wheelchair athletes, and three for visually impaired athletes. The number of events for women was further reduced, down to one, for wheelchair athletes.

Men's events

Women's event

1996
At the 1996 Summer Paralympics in Atlanta, the current categorisation system was introduced. Seven events were held for men, and one for women.

Men's events

Women's event

2000
The same number of events (seven for men, one for women) were maintained at the 2000 Summer Games in Sydney.

Men's events

Women's event

2004
At the 2004 Summer Paralympics in Athens, the number of events for men was reduced to five (one for totally blind athletes, one for visually impaired athletes, and three for wheelchair athletes), while a single wheelchair event was maintained for women.

Men's events

Women's event

2008
At the 2008 Games in Beijing, the number of events for men was again reduced, down to four (one for visually impaired athletes, one for upper limb amputees, two for wheelchair athletes), while a single women's wheelchair event was maintained.

Men's events

Women's event

2012
At the 2012 Games in London, the number of events for men was once more reduced, down to three (one for visually impaired athletes, one for upper limb amputees, one for wheelchair athletes), while a single women's wheelchair event was maintained.

Men's events

Women's event

2016

Medal table

Notes

 
Athletics at the Summer Paralympics
Paralympic
Paralympics